Shahan-e Garmab (also Romanized as Shāhān-e Garmāb, Shāhān Garm Āb, and Shāhān-i-Garmāb; also known as Sha‘bān Garmāb) is a village in Sefid Sang Rural District, Qalandarabad District, Fariman County, Razavi Khorasan Province, Iran. At the 2006 census, its population was 47, in 11 families.

References 

Populated places in Fariman County